Messier 84 or M84, also known as NGC 4374, is a giant elliptical or lenticular galaxy in the constellation Virgo. Charles Messier discovered the object in 1781 in a systematic search for "nebulous objects" in the night sky. It is the 84th object in the Messier Catalogue and in the heavily populated core of the Virgo Cluster of galaxies, part of the local supercluster.

This galaxy has morphological classification E1, denoting it has flattening of about 10%. The central mass-to-light ratio is 6.5, which, to a limit, steadily increases away from the core. The visible galaxy is surrounded by a massive dark matter halo.

Radio observations and Hubble Space Telescope images of M84 have revealed two jets of matter shooting out from its center as well as a disk of rapidly rotating gas and stars indicating the presence of a  supermassive black hole. It also has a few young stars and star clusters, indicating star formation at a very low rate.

Two supernovae have been observed in M84: SN 1957
and SN 1991bg. Seen between these dates, it may have bore a third, SN 1980I – which may have been in either neighboring galaxy NGC 4387 or M86. This high rate of supernovae is rare for elliptical galaxies, which may indicate there is a population of stars of intermediate age in M84.

See also
 List of Messier objects

References and footnotes

External links

 StarDate: M84 Fact Sheet
 SEDS Lenticular Galaxy M84
 

Elliptical galaxies
Lenticular galaxies
Virgo Cluster
Virgo (constellation)
084
NGC objects
07494
40455
17810318
Discoveries by Charles Messier